The Grand Unified Democratic New Party (GUDNP) was a political party of South Korea. It was formed out of the Uri Party and its resulting splinter groups. Chung Dong-young was the party's candidate in the 2007 South Korean presidential election; he lost to Lee Myung-bak. On February 17, 2008, the party merged with the Democratic Party to form the United Democratic Party.

Brief history
The party was formed when loyalists to president Roh Moo-hyun in the Uri Party chose to break ranks from other party members who showed lukewarm support for the administration. Some 80 out of 152 lawmakers of the Uri Party joined the new party, a conservative-liberal minority group from the Hannara Party (led by Son Hak-Gyu), and a group of progressive civil rights' group from outside South Korean politics also joined, seeking to complete political reforms.

As a result of merge with the Uri Party, this party has been ranked as the biggest political party in the legislative by 140 of 298 seats (as of January 14, 2008). After receiving a 'shocked' result at the 2007 presidential election, the delegates of its party decided to elect a new leader, with adopting a 'Papal conclave'-style system. On January 11, with more than a half delegates' vote, Son Hak-gyu was elected to lead at the 2008 parliamentary election.

Principles of policies
This party's platform emphasized these 4 key ideologies.
 Democracy
 Peace
 Integration (political)
 Environmentalism

Presidential election primary

Timeline
These list of key events has been managed by its public primary election committee(국민경선위원회).
August 21 and August 22, 2007 - Official announcement has been made by its committee. Registration process has been done.
August 25, 2007 - The full list of official candidate for the primary has been announced. 'Cut-off' process begins.
August 27, 2007 - 'The policy debate' for its candidates has been done.
September 5, 2007 - The result of cut-off election (to nominate 5 candidates to go to its primary) will be announced.
September 5 to September 14, 2007 - Nationwide 'Policy debate'(tour) will be held in several cities.
September 15 to October 14, 2007 - The primary election will be held in 8 multi-regional areas. (see 'Results' for more details)
October 14, 2007 - Chung Dong-young was elected as the official presidential candidate of the party.

Rules
 Cut-off process (August 25 ~ September 5)
 The official result of cut-off process has been combining a result from public poll(50%), and a poll result from its 10,000 randomly selected delegates(50%). 'Public poll' has been conducted from all eligible voters (whether this party is in favour or not).
 Top-5 candidates who earn more votes will join to its official primary(Result has been announced-see 'Candidates')
 Primary election (September 15 ~ October 14)
The official result of this primary combines all votes of these key methods. First-past-the-post and Electronic voting system is being used.
 1. Regional Rounds from 8 multi-provincial divisions (see below)
 2. The total number of 'Mobile vote' cast
 3. Public opinion polls which conducted from October 8 to 14
Method 1 and 2 grants exactly 90% of results (Method 3 grants 10%). The official candidate of this party will be nominated on October 14, just after the last regional rounds finishes. Due to the executives of this party's decision, All candidates did not contested during the Hangawi holidays and the 2007 Inter-Korean summit periods.

Candidates
As of August 25, 2007, 9 politicians has been set up to their presidential bid. Before starting their official primary to the South Korean public, they have to access the 'cut-off' process to reduce from 9 to 5. Later, the number of candidates reduced to 3 after ex-Health and Welfare Minister Rhyu Si-min and former Prime Minister Han Myeong-sook quit the race.
Here's a list of official candidates of the UNDP primary that announced on September 5, 2007, 05:30GMT.

(Placed in order. Not considered its cut-off results. Based as of September 23, 2007)

Results

Source: The current status of the UNDP Primary, Seoprise.com, Retrieved on October 1, 2007.

Re-merge with Democratic Party
On February,2007, Kim-Han-Kil, who was the flood leader of Uri party, decided to defect Uri party (열린우리당) with 23 councilors. And, they formed the new party (their purpose was the destruction of Uri party (열린우리당), and the president Roh-Mu-Hyun, and his supporters). And some councilors of Uri party (열린우리당), supporters of Kim-Han-Kil, and supporters of Son-Hak-Gyu merged, and then they formed the United New Democracy Party (대통합민주신당).

On February 17, 2008, the UNDP merged with the Democratic Party (민주당), forming the United Democratic Party (통합민주당). This was four years after the Uri Party (열린우리당)'s split from the Millennium Democratic Party (새천년민주당).

Election results

See also
United Democratic Party
Uri Party
Liberalism
Contributions to liberal theory
Liberalism worldwide
List of liberal parties
Liberal democracy
Politics of South Korea
Liberalism in South Korea

References

External links
Official Homepage  (International homepage is under construction)
Official Infopage for the 2007 presidential primary

Democratic parties in South Korea
Korean nationalist parties
Defunct political parties in South Korea
Political parties established in 2007
Political parties disestablished in 2008